Making Overtures: The Story of a Community Orchestra is a 1985 Canadian short documentary film directed by Larry Weinstein. It was nominated for an Academy Award for Best Documentary Short.

References

External links

1985 films
1985 documentary films
English-language Canadian films
Canadian independent films
Documentary films about classical music and musicians
Canadian short documentary films
1980s short documentary films
1985 independent films
1980s English-language films
1980s Canadian films